Nellai S. Muthu (born May 10, 1951) is Tamil writer and a scientist working at the Satish Dhawan Space Centre. He has written many technical books and novels based on science in Tamil. He has won several awards from the Tamil development department of Tamil Nadu for his works Vinveli 2057, Arivutom vingana vilaiyattu, Einsteinum andaveliyum and Ariviyal varalaru

Awards
Muthu received an award from the government of India's National Council for Science and Technology in 2004 for making science accessible to the public through his books, magazine contributions, and other media. He received the Mahakavi Bharathi Aiynthamizh award in the Ariviyal Tamil category from Bharathiar University. He also received the Pal Maruthuvar G. Sitrambalanar award for his work Evurthiyiyal.

References

Tamil-language writers
1951 births
Living people
Scientists from Tamil Nadu